was a Japanese politician who served as foreign minister for six months in 1974.

Early life
Kimura was born into a politically active family on 15 January 1909. His father and grandfather were both lawmakers.

Career
Kimura was elected to the House of Representatives for 12 times as a member of the Liberal Democratic Party (LDP). In addition, he served as chief cabinet secretary in the cabinet led by Prime Minister Eisaku Satō. He was also chairman of the Parliamentarians' League for Japan-Palestine Friendship. He organized Yasser Arafat's visit to Japan in 1981.

His other posts include director-general of the economic planning agency and deputy chief cabinet secretary. In 1971, Kimura served as acting foreign minister. He was appointed foreign minister by Prime Minister Kakuei Tanaka in mid-July 1974, replacing Masayoshi Ohira in the post. Kimura was in office for six months in 1974. Kimura visited Africa in late October and early November 1974 which initiated a cooperation between African countries and Japan. He was the first senior Japanese government official to visit African countries. His Africa visit included Ghana, Nigeria, Zaire (now the Democratic Republic of the Congo), Tanzania, and Egypt. Then Kimura became head of the LDP's Asian-African Studies Group in 1977.

Personal life and death
Kimura was married and had a daughter. He died of a heart attack at a hospital in Tokyo on 1 December 1983 at age 74.

Honours
Grand Cordon of the Order of the Rising Sun (3 November 1983)

References

External links

|-

|-

1909 births
1983 deaths
Foreign ministers of Japan
Government ministers of Japan
Liberal Democratic Party (Japan) politicians
Members of the House of Representatives (Japan)